Kachan (Devanagari: काचन)  is a village development committee in Saptari District in the Sagarmatha Zone of south-eastern Nepal. At the time of the 2011 Nepal census it had a population of 4,199 people living in 793 individual households.

At Present, Kachan is part of the Bodebarsain Municipality and  Province No. 2 in Nepalese administrative geography.

References

Populated places in Saptari District
VDCs in Saptari District